Zach Gentry (born September 10, 1996) is an American football tight end for the Pittsburgh Steelers of the National Football League (NFL). He played college football at Michigan.

Early life
Gentry was a star quarterback for Eldorado High School in his hometown of Albuquerque, New Mexico.

College career
Gentry played college football for Michigan from 2015 to 2018. Originally recruited as a quarterback, Gentry switched to tight end as a freshman, after coach Jim Harbaugh said he would go to the NFL as a tight end.

Professional career

Gentry was drafted by the Pittsburgh Steelers in the fifth round (141st overall) of the 2019 NFL Draft. The Steelers originally acquired the selection in a trade that sent Antonio Brown to the Oakland Raiders. Gentry caught his first professional pass for four yards in Week 15 against the Buffalo Bills.

On November 24, 2020, Gentry was placed on injured reserve after suffering a knee sprain in Week 11.

NFL career statistics

Regular season

Postseason

References

External links
Pittsburgh Steelers bio
Michigan Wolverines bio

1996 births
Living people
American football tight ends
Michigan Wolverines football players
Pittsburgh Steelers players
Players of American football from Albuquerque, New Mexico